Frederick of Lorraine (1371 – October 25, 1415 in the battle of Agincourt) was a Count of Vaudémont.

He was the son of Duke John I of Lorraine and younger brother of Charles II. In 1393, Frederick married Margaret the heiress of Vaudémont and Joinville, and became Count of these lands in her right. He founded the House of Vaudémont, a junior branch of the House of Lorraine.

His children were:
Antoine, who succeeded as Count of Vaudémont,
Elisabeth, who married Philipp I of Nassau-Weilburg, and
Margaret, who married Thibault II of Blamont.

Dynastic problems in the senior line caused his great-grandson René of Vaudémont to become Duke of Lorraine as René II in 1473.

See also
Dukes of Lorraine family tree

House of Vaudémont
Counts of Vaudémont
1371 births
1415 deaths
Military personnel killed in action